Ambili  is an Indian film singer in Malayalam cinema during the 1970s and 1980s. She has sung more than 3000 songs in 800 films. She has sung in Tamil, Hindi and Bengali. Her popular songs are "Thedi varum kannukalil", "Oonjala, oonjala", "Swarnamalakal", "Maayalle raga mazhaville" and "Guruvayoorappante thiruvamruthethinu".

Personal life
Padmaja Thampi, known as Ambili, was born as the youngest among five children to R C Thampi and Sukumari at Thiruvananthapuram. Her father was a military officer who later became a teacher and her mother was a singer. She has three brothers and a sister. She had her education from Fathma College and Delhi University. She had learnt music from Mr. V. Dakshina Murthy. Her debut song was "Karagre vasathe" from the movie Sabarimala Sree Dharmashaastha in 1970. She is married to K G Rajashekharan, a Malayalam film director. They have a son, Raghavendran, and a daughter, Ranjini. She started her own music troop, Mayambu, and performed for stage programs and albums. She received Kala Rathnam Title and Best Singer Award from Kerala Devaswom Board. She currently resides at Chennai with family. She is a recipient of Global NSS (Nair Service Society) award in 2017.

References

External links

Malayalam playback singers
Indian women playback singers
20th-century Indian women classical singers
Living people
Year of birth missing (living people)
Singers from Thiruvananthapuram
Film musicians from Kerala
Women Carnatic singers
Carnatic singers
Women musicians from Kerala